The Dr. J. W. Barnard Building and First National Bank of Joseph, at 12 - 14 Main St. in Joseph, Oregon, is a pair of historic adjacent buildings sharing a common interior wall. They were built by investment of physician Dr. J. W. Barnard, rancher Ludwig Knapper, and banker Frederick Scribner.

The Dr. J. W. Barnard Building was built in 1908 by local contractor Frank Marr, with design by Chicago architects J.A. Flesch & Son.

The First National Bank Building was also built in 1908 by Frank Marr.  It was used as a bank until the bank failed in 1925;  it was then used as a post office.

The pair of buildings was listed on the National Register of Historic Places in 1991;  the listing included two contributing buildings.

References 

Bank buildings on the National Register of Historic Places in Oregon
Commercial buildings on the National Register of Historic Places in Oregon
Romanesque Revival architecture in Oregon
Commercial buildings completed in 1908
Buildings and structures in Wallowa County, Oregon
Joseph, Oregon
National Register of Historic Places in Wallowa County, Oregon
1908 establishments in Oregon